is a private junior college in Nakano, Tokyo, Japan. The precursor of the school was founded in 1933, and it was chartered as a university in 1950.

External links 
  in Japanese

Japanese junior colleges
Private universities and colleges in Japan
Educational institutions established in 1933
Universities and colleges in Tokyo
1933 establishments in Japan